Ceroplesis signata is a species of beetle in the family Cerambycidae. It was described by Waterhouse in 1890. It is known from Eritrea, the Democratic Republic of the Congo, Ethiopia, Uganda, Rwanda, Kenya, and Tanzania. It contains the varietas Ceroplesis signata var. maculata.

References

signata
Beetles described in 1890